Carol Anne Wham is a New Zealand scientist and professor of public health nutrition at Massey University.

Academic career 
Wham graduated with a MSc from the University of Otago in 1994 and then moved to the University of Adelaide to undertake her PhD, with a thesis titled "Changing New Zealanders' attitudes to milk?". She returned to New Zealand, where she has been on the staff of Massey University since 2006. 

In November 2019 Wham was promoted to full professor in the College of Health at Massey University with effect from 1 January 2020.

Selected publications

References

External links 
 

Living people
Year of birth missing (living people)
University of Otago alumni
University of Adelaide alumni
Academic staff of the Massey University
New Zealand women scientists